Pimelea petrophila is a species of flowering plant in the family Thymelaeaceae and is endemic to southern continental Australia. It is an erect, dioecious shrub with hairy young stems, elliptic or narrowly elliptic leaves, and heads of white flowers surrounded by 2 or 4 leaf-like involucral bracts.

Description
Flowering mainly occurs from July to October.

This pimelea is similar to P. flava but has seeds with a pitted (foveate) surface, whereas those of P. flava are furrowed.

Taxonomy and naming
Pimelea petrophila was first formally described in 1853 by Ferdinand von Mueller in journal Linnaea. The specific epithet (petrophila) means "rock-loving".

Distribution and habitat
This pimelea grows on rocky hills on the Eyre Peninsula, Flinders and Mount Lofty Ranges of South Australia and on the Barrier Ranges of far western New South Wales.

References

petrophila
Malvales of Australia
Flora of New South Wales
Flora of South Australia
Taxa named by Ferdinand von Mueller
Plants described in 1853